The Indian Meadows Formation is a Wasatchian geologic formation in Wyoming. It preserves fossils dating back to the Ypresian stage of the Eocene period.

Fossil content 
The following fossils have been reported from the formation:

Mammals 
Primates
 Absarokius abbotti
 Cantius sp.
Artiodactyls
 Diacodexis metsiacus
 Artiodactyla indet.
Cimolesta
 Esthonyx sp.
Eutheria
 Chriacus gallinae
Ferae
 Didymictis sp.
Glires
 Paramys copei
 P. excavatus
Macroscelidea
 Haplomylus speirianus
Multituberculata
 Parectypodus lunatus
Pantodonta
 Coryphodon sp.
Perissodactyls
 Homogalax protapirinus
 Homogalax sp.
 Equidae indet.
Placentalia
 Hyopsodus loomisi
 Phenacodus vortmani
 Ectocion cf. osbornianus
 Hyopsodus sp.
 Phenacodus sp.
Theriiformes
 Oxyaenidae indet.

Wasatchian correlations

See also 
 List of fossiliferous stratigraphic units in Wyoming
 Paleontology in Wyoming

References

Bibliography 

 
 

Geologic formations of Wyoming
Eocene Series of North America
Paleogene geology of Wyoming
Ypresian Stage
Wasatchian
Paleontology in Wyoming